Oplismenus compositus, the running mountaingrass, is a species of perennial plant from the family Poaceae that can be found throughout Asia (Pakistan China), Africa, Australia, South America, Mexico and Hawaii.

Description
O. compositus have a raceme which is composed from inflorescence. Spikelets come in 2 rows which are fertile, pedicelled, and sessile. The pedicels are oblong. The spikelets also have one basal sterile florets and one fertile florets while its rhachilla is not extended.

The glume is shorter than a spikelet and thinner than fertile lemma. It lower glume is ovate with its awn being  in length. The upper glume is also ovate, but unlike the lower, is also herbaceous with glabrous surface which can be pubescent as well. Both florets and glumes are 1-keeled, but the veins are different; Glumes are 5 while florets are 7–11.

References

External links

compositus
Grasses of Asia
Grasses of Oceania
Grasses of North America
Grasses of South America
Grasses of China
Grasses of Mexico
Grasses of Pakistan
Grasses of the United States
Flora of Hawaii
Taxa named by Palisot de Beauvois